Abdel Karim Konate is a Malian politician from ADEMA. He was the Minister of Finance in 2013. 
He serves as the Malian Minister of Commerce.

References

Living people
Finance ministers of Mali
Government ministers of Mali
Alliance for Democracy in Mali politicians
Year of birth missing (living people)
21st-century Malian people